"I Cry" is a song by American hip hop artist Flo Rida. The track was first released on September 18, 2012, as the fourth single from his fourth studio album, Wild Ones. The song is based on Bingo Players' "Cry (Just a Little)" which uses the chorus lyrics from the song "Piano in the Dark" by Brenda Russell. "I Cry" was produced by the French production duo soFLY & Nius and the Futuristics, and it was written by Flo Rida, The Futuristics, Scott Cutler, Jeffrey Hull, Brenda Russell, and soFLY & Nius.

"I Cry" received mixed reviews from music critics, who criticized its lyrical content and production, and stated that it would have been better with a collaboration with Sia, who previously collaborated with Flo Rida on the song, "Wild Ones". However, some critics were positive towards its catchiness and club-nature. The song received commercial success upon its release, peaking inside the top ten in many countries including Australia, Austria, Canada, Denmark, Finland, France, Germany, New Zealand, Norway, Switzerland, United Kingdom and United States. A music video was released for the single on YouTube. This song is the second track on Now 45.

Critical reception 
"I Cry" received generally mixed reviews from most music critics. Andy Gill from The Independent said that this track and "In My Mind (Part 2)" are "galloping grooves." Chris Payne from Billboard was favorable, saying, "After repeat listens "I Cry" might sound a good deal like the rest of "Wild Ones," but played in a club at the right time, it's got enough building beats and poppy climaxes to deliver." AbsolutePunk said that "I Cry" was a "decent dance cut, using a sample from the Bingo Players for the hook."

However, Melissa Maerz from Entertainment Weekly said, "Most bizarre is "I Cry", which speeds up Brenda Russell's 1988 smooth-jazz cheesefest "Piano in the Dark" until it has all the emotional heft of an LMFAO track. You couldn't program a robot to cry to it." Gleen Glomboa from Newsday said the sample of "Piano in the Dark" was "off" and wanted it to "speed up a bit." Robert Copsey from Digital Spy gave it a rather scathing review, only awarding it one star out of five. He stated, "'I Cry' is just sheer laziness [...] Flo waxes the usual lyrical nonsense about champagne buckets and his tattoo of Jimi Hendrix." Copsey also thought it would have been better as a collaboration with "Wild Ones" guest vocalist Sia. He stated, "We've said it once and we'll say it again: Bring back Sia!"

Chart performance 
"I Cry" was a commercial success upon its release, performing particularly well in European countries. The song first charted in Norway, debuting at number 8 on the Norwegian Singles Chart and rising to number 1 the following week, where it lasted for three weeks in total. In Denmark, the song debuted at number 9 for the chart week ending September 7, 2012, and reached a peak of number 8 on September 16. "I Cry" also performed strongly in Ireland and the United Kingdom: it reached number 16 in Ireland on September 13, 2012, and reached a peak of number 3 on the UK Singles Chart for the chart week dated September 30, 2012.

In Australia, "I Cry" first appeared and peaked on the Australian Singles Chart at number 3 on September 16, 2012, remaining at that position for two weeks in total. The song peaked at number ten in New Zealand, debuting at number 17 on September 17, 2012, and rising to its peak position the following week.

Music video
A music video for the song was released on September 30, 2012, directed by Marc Klasfeld. The video includes footage of Flo Rida visiting his home neighborhood in Carol City, Florida to tell his story of his struggle to fame and fortune while crying seeing the town's wealth. The music video premiered on BET's 106 & Park on October 11, 2012, when Flo Rida visited the show.

Track listing
Digital download
"I Cry" – 3:42

CD single
"I Cry"
"Whistle" (Jakob Lido remix)

Charts and certifications

Weekly charts

Year-end charts

Certifications

|-

Radio and release history

References

2012 singles
Flo Rida songs
Number-one singles in Finland
Number-one singles in Norway
Music videos directed by Marc Klasfeld
Song recordings produced by SoFly and Nius
Songs written by Brenda Russell
Songs written by Scott Cutler
Songs written by Maarten Hoogstraten
Songs written by Paul Bäumer (musician)
2012 songs
Songs written by Flo Rida
Song recordings produced by the Futuristics
Songs written by Joe Khajadourian
Songs written by Alex Schwartz